The 1945 Texas Longhorns football team represented the University of Texas at Austin during the 1945 college football season.

Schedule

Awards and honors
Hub Bechtol, End, Cotton Bowl co-Most Valuable Player
Bobby Layne, Back, Cotton Bowl co-Most Valuable Player
Hub Bechtol, Consensus All-American

References

Texas
Texas Longhorns football seasons
Southwest Conference football champion seasons
Cotton Bowl Classic champion seasons
Texas Longhorns football